Saint-Ambroise may refer to:

 Saint-Ambroise, Quebec, Canada
 Saint-Ambroise Church, Montreal, Quebec, Canada
 Saint-Ambroise-de-Kildare, Quebec, Canada
 Saint-Ambroise (Paris Métro)
 Saint-Ambroise, Paris, a Roman Catholic parish church in France

See also
 Saint Ambrose
 Sant'Ambrogio (disambiguation)
 Ambroise (disambiguation)